Chugoku Electric Power Rugby Football Club – nicknamed the Red Regulions – is a Japanese rugby union team, currently playing in the Japan Rugby League One. The team is the rugby team of electric utilities provider Chugoku Electric Power, based in Hiroshima in the Chūgoku region.

The team was created in 1987 as the rugby union team for Chugoku Electric Power. When rugby union in Japan was restructured in 2003 with the introduction of the Top League, Chugoku Electric Power was allocated to the second tier Top Kyūshū League. They remained in that league until a further restructuring prior to the 2017–18 saw the team promoted to a newly established Top Challenge League. In July 2017, they also adopted the name Red Regulions for the team.

Current squad

The Chugoku Red Regulions squad for the 2023 season is:

Season history

Chugoku Electric Power's record in the top two tiers since the formation of the Top Kyūshū League in 2003 was:

External links

References

Rugby in Kansai
Rugby clubs established in 1987
Sports teams in Aichi Prefecture
1987 establishments in Japan
Japan Rugby League One teams